Codename Cougar (also known as Codename: Cougar, Operation Cougar or The Puma Action) is a 1989 Chinese thriller film. It was co-directed by Zhang Yimou and Yang Fengliang. Unlike the bulk of Zhang's early works (ranging from 1986's Red Sorghum to 1995's Shanghai Triad), which were all historical pieces, Codename Cougar is a modern thriller involving a skyjacked airliner and political intrigue.

The film was made as a private investment by a friend of Zhang, but parts of their initial ideas were censored by the Chinese authorities.  In the end, the film broke even but earned no profits.  Zhang called it "a purely commercial gun chase film".

Plot

The film follows a commercial airliner on a routine flight between Taipei and Seoul that is hijacked and taken to mainland China by the fictional Taiwan Revolutionary Army Front. Communist authorities cannot seize the plane because of the presence of an important business figure on the flight, and agree to cooperate discreetly with Taiwanese authorities to defuse an already tense situation.

Cast
 Gong Li as A Li
 Ge You as Zheng Xianping
 Liu Xiaoning as Liang Zhuang
 Wang Xueqi as Huang Jingru
 Tian Min
 Yang Yazhou
 Yu Rongguang

Reception 

The film is generally considered a failure or a footnote to Zhang's general oeuvre; Time referred to the film as Zhang Yimou's last "purely frivolous work."

References

External links 

1989 films
1989 thriller films
1980s Mandarin-language films
Chinese aviation films
Films directed by Zhang Yimou
Chinese thriller films